The number of elections in Nebraska varies by year. Nebraska has a gubernatorial election every four years.  Members of the state's United States congressional delegation run for election or re-election at the times set out in the United States Constitution.  Primary elections assist in choosing political parties' nominees for various positions.  On a regional basis, elections also cover municipal issues.  In addition, a special election can occur at any time.

In a 2020 study, Nebraska was ranked as the 22nd easiest state for citizens to vote in.

Voter Qualifications
To register to vote in Nebraska, each applicant must be a citizen of the United States, a resident of the Nebraska county in which they are registering, and at least 18 years old by the first Tuesday after the first Monday in November. Citizens are eligible to register to vote on January 1 of the year they will turn 18 before the November general election. Individuals who have been convicted of a felony are ineligible to register to vote until two years after the terms of their sentence have been completed, and individuals who have been declared mentally incompetent by a court are ineligible to register to vote.

Recent Elections

Gubernatorial 
The Governor of Nebraska is elected every 4 years, and is restricted to 2 terms. 

2018 gubernatorial election
2018 gubernatorial election
2018 gubernatorial election
2018 gubernatorial election
2018 gubernatorial election
2018 gubernatorial election

Senatorial
2020 United States Senate election in Nebraska
2018 United States Senate election in Nebraska
2014 United States Senate election in Nebraska
2012 United States Senate election in Nebraska
2008 United States Senate election in Nebraska

See also 
 United States presidential elections in Nebraska
 Elections in the United States

References

External links
 

Nebraska elections
Government of Nebraska